Septemvri Stadium is a multi-use stadium in Smolyan, Bulgaria.  It is currently used mostly for football matches and is the home stadium of Rodopa Smolyan. The stadium holds 6,100 people.

Football venues in Bulgaria
Smolyan
Buildings and structures in Smolyan Province